Jan Fredrik Vogt (born 18 February 1974) is a Norwegian politician for the Progress Party.

He served as a deputy representative to the Norwegian Parliament from Vestfold during the term 2005–2009.

He hails from Sande, Vestfold.

See also
Politics of Norway

References

1974 births
Living people
Deputy members of the Storting
Progress Party (Norway) politicians
Vestfold politicians
People from Sande, Vestfold
21st-century Norwegian politicians